The 2022 Yas Island FIA Formula 2 round was a motor racing event held between 18 and 20 November 2022 at the Yas Marina Circuit, Abu Dhabi, United Arab Emirates. It was the final race of the 2022 Formula 2 Championship and was held in support of the 2022 Abu Dhabi Grand Prix.

After winning the Drivers' Championship with Felipe Drugovich, MP Motorsport also secured its first Teams' Championship in Formula 2 history after Drugovich finished runner-up in the Feature Race. Logan Sargeant ensured he had sufficient FIA Super License points to be promoted to a 2023 Formula One seat with Williams Racing by finishing fourth in the Drivers' Championship.

Report

Championship standings before the round

Drivers' Championship 
Brazilian racing driver Felipe Drugovich had already won the 2022 FIA Formula 2 Drivers' Championship in Monza, having extended an unassailable 77-point lead over his closest rival, Théo Pourchaire.

During the weekend of the 2022 United States Grand Prix, former Williams Racing Team Principal and CEO Jost Capito announced that Logan Sargeant would be promoted from the Williams Driver Academy to a Formula One race seat in 2023 if he finished high enough in the standings to qualify for an FIA Super Licence. Having aleady accumulated 29 Super Licence points, Sargeant would need to finish at least fifth in the Drivers' Championship (or sixth, without receiving any penalty points); Sargeant was in third place ahead of the Yas Island Formula 2 round.

Teams' Championship 
MP Motorsport, ART Grand Prix, and Carlin were in contention for the 2022 FIA Formula 2 Teams' Championship. Both MP Motorsport and ART Grand Prix were level on points; however, MP Motorsport was ahead on countback due to having won more races. Carlin were third in the standings, twenty-three points behind the two other title contenders.

Driver changes 
Trident driver Calan Williams parted ways with his team before the Yas Marina season finale. He was replaced by 2022 FIA Formula 3 vice champion Zane Maloney, who made his FIA Formula 2 Championship debut.

Van Amersfoort Racing driver David Beckmann was replaced by Juan Manuel Correa, who returned to Formula 2 for the first time since his accident in 2019.

Qualifying 
Qualifying was red-flagged twice. The first red flag was deployed seven minutes into the session, after Virtuosi driver Marino Sato spun out at Turn 14. Sato was unable to set a qualifying time within the 107% rule, but was granted permission by the stewards to start the race after setting acceptable times in practice. The session was green-flagged after a five-minute delay.

Despite having an earlier lap time deleted for track limits, Ayumu Iwasa qualified on pole with a lap time of 1:36.290. His teammate, Roy Nissany, locked out the front row for DAMS with a time which was 0.036 seconds slower. Carlin finished qualifying as the only other team with two drivers inside the top ten. Shortly after Iwasa's pole position lap, a second, session-ending red flag was deployed following Zane Maloney's spin at Turn 9.

Sprint race 
Richard Verschoor started the sprint race from pole, but was overtaken by eventual sprint race winner Liam Lawson on Lap 10. Felipe Drugovich made up four places from seventh place on the grid to finish in third. Dennis Hauger finished in fourth, while Amaury Cordeel secured his best Formula 2 finish in fifth place. Logan Sargeant held on to his starting position of sixth, despite dropping down to ninth on the opening lap; a red flag, deployed after Enzo Fittipaldi and Jehan Daruvala collided at Turn 3, enabled Sargeant to return to his original starting position for the rolling restart. Jack Doohan finished in seventh, unable to overtake Sargeant despite the American driver having a flat-spotted left front tyre. Roy Nissany was the final points finisher in eighth place.

Feature race 
Ayumu Iwasa won the feature race from pole position after battling Felipe Drugovich, whose second-place finish secured the 2022 Teams' Championship title for MP Motorsport. Liam Lawson finished in third, leapfrogging Carlin ahead of ART Grand Prix to finish second in the teams' standings. A virtual safety car was deployed on the opening lap after Ralph Boschung made contact with Juan Manuel Correa before spinning out at Turn 9. Boschung retired from the race, having been unable to recover his car. Théo Pourchaire made the first overtake after racing resumed on Lap 3, demoting Dennis Hauger down to third. Drugovich followed soon after with a move on Roy Nissany to take second.

A marginally quicker pit stop allowed Lawson to overtake Hauger in the pit lane on Lap 8, allowing the Carlin driver to assume a net position of third, behind Iwasa and Drugovich. Jack Doohan pit on Lap 26, having been one of the few drivers starting on medium compound tyres; however, his front left tyre detached following his pit stop, forcing him to retire from the race and triggering another virtual safety car. Théo Pourchaire suffered a terminal mechanical issue after hitting a bird with four laps to go, causing him to retire from the race. Hauger and Logan Sargeant finished fourth and fifth respectively, with Amaury Cordeel, Richard Verschoor, Jüri Vips, Marcus Armstrong and Nissany the rest of the points finishers. Nissany received a five-second time penalty for track limits, dropping him down from his on-track finishing position of seventh.

Classification

Qualifying

Notes
 – Ralph Boschung originally qualified fourteenth, but received a three-place grid drop for the next race he participates in (Sprint Race) for both rejoining the track in an unsafe manner and causing a collision with Théo Pourchaire at the previous round in Monza.

Sprint race 

Notes:
 – Juan Manuel Correa originally finished fifteenth, but later received a five-second time penalty for causing a collision with Marino Sato, dropping him down to eighteenth place.

Feature race

Final championship standings 

Drivers' Championship standings

Teams' Championship standings

 Note: Only the top five positions are included for both sets of standings.
 Note: Bold names include the Drivers' and Teams' Champion respectively.

See also 
2022 Abu Dhabi Grand Prix

References

External links 
 Official website

Yas Island
Yas Island Formula 2
Yas Island Formula 2